David Adams Hollingsworth (November 21, 1844 – December 3, 1929) was an American lawyer and Civil War veteran who served three terms as a U.S. Representative from Ohio in the early 20th century.

Early life and career
Born in Belmont, Ohio, Hollingsworth moved with his parents to Flushing, Ohio.
He attended the public schools. He was a private in Company B, 25th Ohio Infantry Regiment of the Union Army from 1861 to 1863. He studied law at Mount Union College, Alliance, Ohio. He was admitted to the bar in St. Clairsville, Ohio, on September 17, 1867, and commenced practice in Flushing.

Political career 
He served as mayor of Flushing in 1867.
He moved to Cadiz, Ohio, in 1869 and continued the practice of law.

Hollingsworth was elected prosecuting attorney of Harrison County in 1873 and reelected in 1875.
He served as member of the State senate in 1879 and reelected in 1881.
He was admitted to practice before the United States Supreme Court in 1880.
He served as chairman of the Republican State convention in 1882.
On April 21, 1883, he resigned as Senator to accept appointment as Ohio Attorney General. He did not run for re-election and served until January 14, 1884.
He resumed the practice of law in Cadiz.
He was one of the organizers of the Ohio State Bar Association, serving as chairman in 1908.

Congress 
Hollingsworth was elected as a Republican to the Sixty-first Congress (March 4, 1909 – March 3, 1911).
He was an unsuccessful candidate for reelection in 1910 to the Sixty-second Congress.
He resumed the practice of law in Cadiz.

Hollingsworth was elected to the Sixty-fourth and Sixty-fifth Congresses (March 4, 1915 – March 3, 1919).
He declined to be a candidate for renomination in 1918.

Later career and death 
He resumed the practice of law until his death in Cadiz, Ohio, December 3, 1929.
He was interred in Cadiz Cemetery.

Personal life 
He was married April 8, 1875, to Linda McBean of Cadiz. She had two sons, Henry, and Donald, who died in early childhood. Hollingsworth was a Mason, Elk, Knight of Pythias, Methodist, and member of the Grand Army of the Republic.

Sources

External links

Further reading

1844 births
1929 deaths
People from Cadiz, Ohio
People from Belmont, Ohio
Ohio Attorneys General
Republican Party Ohio state senators
University of Mount Union alumni
County district attorneys in Ohio
Mayors of places in Ohio
People of Ohio in the American Civil War
Union Army soldiers
People from Flushing, Ohio
Republican Party members of the United States House of Representatives from Ohio